Industry-oriented education is an approach to education from an industry perspective.

Definition
Industry oriented education is an approach to learning from an industry perspective where traditional subjects such as maths, physics and science are taught in the context of application of that knowledge to product design, development and operation.  

With traditional technical teaching methodologies in educational environments, the conventional pathway is to build the foundation learning through subject based teaching of maths, physics and science independently. Subjects based on the knowledge required for the discipline usually follow on from this. The problem with this traditional methodology of learning is that there is no close relationship with industry requirements. Students may well graduate with no industrial oriented learning experience prior to their first job.

Practice 
It has been applied to vocational education. It was only offered to sub-degree education and industry training until 2004. Since 2004 Industry Oriented Education has been introduced to higher education as part of study for undergraduate degrees and Master's degrees.

Examples
As an example, the course of Electronics Technology in the Bachelor of Applied Technology is directly linked to industry and the focus is on an industrial product such as a Switch-mode power supply. The internal components form the topics for study: this includes the mechanical design for the enclosure, electronic design including the PCB (printed circuit board) and embedded software design. The focus for learning is product design, application and operation of electronic components and circuitry. The industrial product will be activated under simulated industry conditions where students will gain invaluable insight of design technology, operational procedure and programming techniques. All foundation skills can be achieved within these studies and the students are well prepared to develop further knowledge and skills required for their industry project required in their final year through cooperative education with industry. Mathematics is not taught here as an independent course of study, but totally integrated into the compulsory technical courses. As an example, the course of Electronics Technology taught in the Bachelor of Applied Technology uses fast Fourier transform series to explore the method of electromagnetic interference (EMI) in Switch-mode power supplies. Initially students will receive a demonstration and the product which is a commercial product, will be opened for internal investigation of the enclosure. The internal components form the topics for study: this includes the mechanical design for the enclosure, electronic design including the PCB (Printed Circuit Board) and embedded software design. The focus for learning is product design, application and operation of electronic components and circuitry.

An example in post-graduate program is a “bridging” technology course designed for the first year students in Master of Design program before they start their projects. It is to enable a Bachelor of Design graduate to entry this technology oriented program.

See also

 Institute of technology
 Sandwich degree in the United Kingdom

References

Alternative education
Vocational education
Pedagogy